Satan in Prison is a 1907 French short silent film by Georges Méliès. The film tells the story of an imprisoned man (played by Méliès himself) who turns out to be the Devil in disguise.

Plot
The film features Méliès in a room which is intended to be a cell and he finds ways to cure his boredom by performing tricks, such as vanishing and magically appearing picture frames and sudden appearing fireplaces and dinner tables with wine. Towards the end of the film he appears as Satan and tricks his guards by disappearing in a blanket.

Production and release
Méliès, who had begun his performing career as a successful stage magician, often featured the Devil in his films, taking advantage of the character's possibilities as a creator of strange magical happenings. In Satan in Prison, as was his usual practice, Méliès himself appears as the Devil.

The film's special effects were created with pyrotechnics and substitution splices. Méliès filmed an expanded version of the same idea, with many of the same props but with more characters and a more elaborate narrative, two years later as The Diabolic Tenant. Satan in Prison was sold by Méliès's Star Film Company and numbered 1010–1013 in its catalogues.

References

External links

 

1907 films
French black-and-white films
Films directed by Georges Méliès
French silent short films
French science fiction films
The Devil in film
Silent horror films
1900s French films